The Daily Star is a leading Bangladeshi English-language daily newspaper. It is the largest circulating daily English-language newspaper in the country. Founded by Syed Mohammed Ali on 14 January 1991, as Bangladesh transitioned and restored parliamentary democracy, the newspaper became popular for its outspoken coverage of politics, corruption and foreign policy. It is considered a newspaper of record for Bangladesh. The newspaper is known for its "reputation for journalistic integrity and liberal and progressive views - a kind of Bangladeshi New York Times". Its slogan is "Journalism Without Fear or Favour". 

Mahfuz Anam serves as editor and publisher of The Daily Star. Its motto, "Your Right to Know", appears above its logo on the front page. The Daily Star is owned by Mediaworld, in which a major share is held by the Transcom Group. Star Business is the business edition of the paper and highly popular.

History
In the late 1980s, plans for a major English newspaper in Bangladesh were drawn up by Syed Mohammad Ali and Mahfuz Anam in Bangkok. Ali previously served as Editor of The Bangkok Post in Thailand and the Hong Kong Standard in British Hong Kong. Anam was working in UNESCO when he teamed up with Ali to establish a newspaper in Bangladesh. They secured funding from leading Bangladeshi financiers, including Azimur Rahman, A. S. Mahmud, Latifur Rahman, A. Rouf Chowdhury and Shamsur Rahman. The newspaper was set up in 1991, which coincided with Bangladesh's return to parliamentary democracy after 15 years of military rule and presidential government. The Daily Star gained popularity for its outspoken coverage of politics in Bangladesh, including the rivalry between the Awami League led by Sheikh Hasina and the Bangladesh Nationalist Party (BNP) led by Khaleda Zia. It became the country's largest circulating English language newspaper and quickly overtook The Bangladesh Observer and Weekly Holiday. It gained a wide readership in Dhaka and Chittagong, particularly among the urban elites, the business community and the diplomatic community.

In 2007, The Daily Star editor Mahfuz Anam called out army chief General Moeen U Ahmed for suggesting political reforms, arguing that it was beyond the mandate of the army chief to speak about politics. In a widely read commentary titled "This is no way to strengthen democracy", Anam also blasted the military-backed caretaker government for the arrest of Sheikh Hasina in 2007. In 2009, an investigative report by The Daily Star implicated former Prime Minister Khaleda Zia's son Tarique Rahman and close aides from Hawa Bhaban in the 2004 Dhaka grenade attack. Tarique Rahman was later sentenced to life imprisonment for his role in the attack. In 2015, the government of Prime Minister Sheikh Hasina suspended all tender notices and government adverts in The Daily Star as a pressure tactic because government ads generate a significant share of revenue for the newspaper; this suspension was later lifted. In 2021, a commentary by Mahfuz Anam criticized army chief General Aziz Ahmed for controversial remarks in which Aziz suggested that criticizing the army chief was tantamount to criticizing Prime Minister Sheikh Hasina.

Staff
After the death of Ali, Anam took over as editor and publisher of the newspaper. Anam has been credited for steering the paper's editorial independence. Financial affairs are overseen by a six member board of directors, including the current chairperson Rokeya Afzal Rahman. Aasha Mehreen Amin serves as head of the Op-Ed section, which was previously headed by Zafar Sobhan. Amin, who previously ran the paper's Star magazine supplement, was promoted to Senior Deputy Editor. Amin has increasingly taken charge of the paper's editorial views and content which have become highly critical of the Awami League government and sympathetic to the BNP.

Controversy
In recent years, the paper has complained of growing restrictions on press freedom in Bangladesh. It also faced pressure from the government which affected its ad revenues. PEN America strongly criticized the lawsuits filed against Mahfuz Anam, including as many as 83 lawsuits and 30 counts of criminal defamation lodged by members and supporters of the Awami League. During the Bangladesh Nationalist Party government in the 2000s, Anam faced defamation lawsuits from ruling BNP leaders. He was co-accused with Matiur Rahman, editor of the Bengali newspaper Prothom Alo, in defamation cases filed by Salahuddin Quader Chowdhury. Anam was represented in court by Kamal Hossain.

In 2016, speaking at a panel discussion on ATN News, Mahfuz Anam admitted that The Daily Star ran stories fed to the newspaper by military intelligence outfit DGFI during the military-backed state of emergency and caretaker government in 2007 and 2008. The stories accused Awami League and BNP leaders of corruption.

Website blocked
The newspaper's website was briefly blocked on 1 June 2018 after it reported the extrajudicial killing of Ekramul Haque by members of the Rapid Action Battalion. The killing took place while the victim was speaking with his family on the phone. The Bangladesh Telecommunication Regulatory Commission (BTRC) did not give any explanation for the block.

See also
 List of newspapers in Bangladesh

References

External links
 

Publications established in 1991
English-language newspapers published in Bangladesh
1991 establishments in Bangladesh
Newspapers published in Dhaka
Daily newspapers published in Bangladesh